Vanstraelenia chirophthalma, the African solenette, is a species of sole native to the Atlantic coast of Africa where it is found from Guinea-Bissau south to Angola. This species grows to a length of  TL. This species is the only known member of its genus.

References

Soleidae
Taxa named by Paul Chabanaud
Monotypic fish genera